Silvio Emerson de Sousa Ferreira do Nascimento (born 11 November 1987), popularly as Sílvio Nascimento, is an Angolan actor and producer. He is best known for the roles in the television serials Windeck and Jikulumessu as well as films, Njinga: Queen of Angola and Blood Lines.

Personal life
He was born on 11 November 1987 in Lubango, southern Huila province, Angola.

Career
Nascimento started his career with theater at the age of seven when he performed in the school play “Sé Catedral”. At 18, he joined the theater group "Os Vozes Soltas". He continued his activities at the Luanda national ballet, in 2006. In 2008, he joined the group "Henrique Artes", and worked in “Hotel Komarka”. Then he visited several countries such as Cape Verde, Brazil, Portugal, Mozambique, South Africa and the United States of America to learn acting. In the same year, he made his film debut with Reduced to Nothing directed by Jack Caleia and Divua António. In 2009, he acted in the film Assaltos em Luanda 2, and the TV program Conversas no Quinta. In 2010, he joined with the weekly TV program on the fight against HIV discrimination Stop SIDA in which he continued for two years as the main face of the program. This made his breakthrough in drama and television among the Angolan public.

In 2011, he won the “Festlip” award for best CPLP group as a member of Henrique Artes. Then in 2012, he won the National Prize for Culture and Arts in Angola. In 2013 he acted in the serial Njinga Rainha de Angola and played the role "Kasa Cangola". For the role, he won his first international film prize in Jakarta. In 2014 and 2015, he nominated for the "Moda Luanda" trophies in the category of Best Actor of Angola. Later he received the distinction of best actor by TV ZAP in the Zap News Program. In 2015 and 2016, he joined the telenovela Jikulumessu, with the character Paulo Almeida. For this role, he won the Seoul International AWARDS award in the category of best drama series.

In the meantime, Nascimento received the title of Ambassador of Angolan Youth Culture in the USA. Prior to that, he had two nominations for “Emmys International TV Festival” for the soap operas Windeck in 2014 and Jikulumessu in 2015. In 2017, he won the Luanda Fashion Award for the Best Actor. In 2018, he won the award for the Golden Globe Angola for Best Actor. In 2021, he signed an agreement with RTP-Africa to exhibit the Tellas digitl platform that show films and other content of the seventh art by Angolan, Cape Verdean, Mozambican, Bissau-Guinean and Sao Tome directors. In the same year, he represented Angola at the "Berlinale" - 71st Berlin Film Festival, in Germany.

Filmography

References

External links
 

Living people
21st-century Angolan people
1987 births
Angolan actors